Nejjo Airport  is an airstrip serving Nejo in Ethiopia. The runway boundaries are not marked and poorly defined.

See also
Transport in Ethiopia

References

 OurAirports - Ethiopia
  Great Circle Mapper - Nejjo
 Nejjo
 Google Earth

Airports in Ethiopia